Fred William "Dutch" Hengeveld (March 23, 1897 – February 5, 1969) was an American college sports coach. He was the head coach of Davidson College's men's basketball team between 1919–20 and 1921–22 and their baseball team between 1920 and 1922. He compiled a 20–20 overall record in basketball, while in baseball his record was 23–26–1.

Hengeveld played minor league baseball for the Little Rock Travelers of the Southern Association from 1919 through 1921. He also had a son, Fred Hengeveld, Jr., who graduated from Davidson College in 1951 and then had a professional minor league in the St. Louis Cardinals organization from 1953 to 1958.

Head coaching record

Basketball

Baseball

References

External links
 

1897 births
1969 deaths
Davidson Wildcats baseball coaches
Davidson Wildcats men's basketball coaches
Little Rock Travelers players
People from Mecklenburg County, North Carolina
People from Palatka, Florida